South Zone or Southern Zone may refer to:
 South Zone cricket team, an Indian first-class cricket team
 South Zone cricket team (Bangladesh), a Bangladeshi first-class cricket team
 South Zone Culture Centre, in Thanjavur, Tamil Nadu, India
 South Zone of São Paulo, Brazil
 South Zone (Rio de Janeiro), the southern section of the city of Rio de Janeiro, Brazil
 Southern Zone International Airport, an airport planned for construction in Osa Canton, Puntarenas Province, Costa Rica
 Southern Indo-Aryan languages
 Zona Sur, a natural region of Chile
 Zone libre, a partition of the France during the Second World War, called the South Zone from November 1942